Denis O'Driscoll (born 1952) is an Irish retired Gaelic footballer who played as a left corner-back for the Cork senior team.

O'Driscoll joined the panel during the 1975 championship and was a regular member of the starting fifteen for just one season during the 1976 championship. During that time he enjoyed little success, ending up as a Munster runner-up on one occasion.

At club level O'Driscoll is a three-time All-Ireland medalist with Nemo Rangers. In addition to this he has also won five Munster medals and six county club championship medals.

References

1952 births
Living people
Nemo Rangers Gaelic footballers
Cork inter-county Gaelic footballers